Lobophyllia costata, common name lobed cactus coral, is a species of large polyp stony coral in the family Lobophylliidae.

Distribution
This species is present in the Indo-Pacific.

Habitat
These tropical reef-associated corals can be found in the upper reef slopes and in the lagoonsat a depth of 3–25 m.

References

Lobophylliidae
Corals described in 1846